Alcoves are created through weathering, erosion, dry granular flow, and stress. It's also the geographical and geological term for a steep-sided hollow in the side of an exposed rock face or cliff of a homogeneous rock type, that was water eroded. Another factor in the formation of alcoves is winds between mid to late summer that steepen at the edge which leads to the failure and shaping of sand deposition in certain areas.

Location

Although alcoves are both found in the northern and southern hemisphere, more newly developed alcoves are in the northern hemisphere region. Around the North Pole, dune alcoves are formed and scarp avalanches can form.

Alcoves are weathering features common in dissected horizontal strata.  Alcoves form where chemical and physical weathering is concentrated along horizontal discontinuities where water and salts concentrate, such as the contact between a sandstone and an underlying shale bed. In the case of layered sandstones, an alcove may later be enlarged by exfoliation of upper layers.  This is commonly seen in the sandstone alcoves of the Colorado Plateau, like those in Navajo Sandstone.

References 

Landforms